The Tuhinj Valley is a valley in Slovenia linking the Celje Basin with the Ljubljana Basin in an east-west direction  along the courses of the Nevljica and Motnišnica rivers.

Geography
The western part of the valley was formed by the watershed of the Nevljica, flowing into the Kamnik Bistrica, and the narrower, eastern part by the Motnišnica, a tributary of the Savinja River. Their drainage divide is at the Kozjak Pass at an elevation of 655 m between Cirkuše v Tuhinju and Špitalič. The largest settlements in the valley include Laze v Tuhinju, Šmartno v Tuhinju, and Motnik. The large number of old settlements points to the fact that the valley was an important thoroughfare in the Middle Ages and later as a passage between Lower Styria and Upper Carniola.

Name
The Tuhinj region was mentioned in written sources circa 1400 as Tuchein, Tuchen, and Tucheiner alben. The name was originally *Tuxyn′ь, derived from the hypocorism *Tuxynъ (based on the Slavic personal name *Tuxъ or *Tuxa). This root is also the source of similar names such as Tuhinje in Herzegovina, Tuin in Macedonia, Tukhin in Russia, and Tuchyňa in Slovakia.

Industry
Until the mid-20th century brown coal was mined in the valley near Motnik. Tourism has only recently started to develop with the building of the Snovik Spa.

References

External links 

Valleys in Upper Carniola
Kamnik Bistrica basin
Savinja basin